The 2010 Campeonato Brasileiro Série A was the 54th edition of the Campeonato Brasileiro Série A, the top-level of professional football in Brazil. It began on May 8 and ended on December 5. Flamengo came as the defending champion having won the 2009 season.

Format
For the eighth consecutive season, the tournament will be played in a double round-robin system. The team with most points will be declared the champion. The bottom-four teams will be relegated for the following season.

International qualification
The Série A will serve as a qualifier to CONMEBOL's 2011 international tournaments. Since Internacional won the 2010 Copa Libertadores, the top-two teams in the standings will qualify to the Second Stage of the 2011 Copa Libertadores, while the next two best teams in the standings will qualify to the First Stage, if the 2011 Copa Sudamericana isn't conquered by a Brazilian club. If that happens, the fourth placed team will not qualify to the Libertadores. Santos, as the winner of the 2010 Copa do Brasil, has an automatic berth to the Second Stage of the competition. The next eight best teams in the standings will earn berths to the Second Stage of the 2011 Copa Sudamericana.

Team information
Last season, Coritiba, Santo André, Náutico, and Sport were relegated after finishing in the last four position in the standings. There were replaced by four-time champion Vasco da Gama, one-time champion Guarani, Ceará, and Atlético Goianiense, the top-four finishers of the 2009 Série B.

During the off-season, Barueri-based club Grêmio Recreativo Barueri, simply known as Barueri, moved to Presidente Prudente, thus changed their name to Grêmio Prudente Futebol.

During the championship, some clubs' venues were transferred to secondary stadia as their home venues are being reformed in preparations for the 2014 FIFA World Cup to be held in Brazil.

Managerial changes

League table

Results

Top goalscorers

1 Two goals scored for São Paulo
2 Two goals scored for Cruzeiro

References

External links
Official webpage 
Official regulations 

Campeonato Brasileiro Série A seasons
1